Limimaricola hongkongensis is a Gram-negative, non-spore-forming, short rod-shaped and non-motile bacterium from the genus of Limimaricola which has been isolated from biofilm from Hong Kong.

References 

Rhodobacteraceae
Bacteria described in 2004